"Charlotte" is a single by Bournemouth-based alternative rock band Air Traffic. Taken from the band's debut studio album Fractured Life, the track was released through Tiny Consumer, a record label division of EMI. "Charlotte" was first released as part of the band's debut single, a double a-side with "Just Abuse Me", on July 17, 2006. The single was released as the fifth in a series of black and white vinyls by Label Fandango - the independent record label of live music promotion company Club Fandango - which was the band's record label at the time.

"Charlotte" was re-released on March 26, 2007, becoming the band's first proper single. The re-released single received moderate airplay on radio and music television channels, particularly as part of the MTV2/NME Chart and MTV2's "Spanking New Music" show. It stayed on the UK Singles Chart for one week on April 7, 2007, at #33.

Track listings
CD (B000NO20II)
"Charlotte" (2:23)
"An End to All Our Problems" (5:03)
"Learning How to Shout" (2:48)
"Charlotte" (2:23)

7" vinyl (B000NO20M4)
"Charlotte" (2:23)
"An End to All Our Problems" (5:03)
"Learning How to Shout" (2:48)
"Charlotte" (2:23)

References

2007 singles
Air Traffic songs
2006 songs
EMI Records singles